This is the complete list of Asian Games medalists in soft tennis from 1994 to 2018.

Events

Men's singles

Men's doubles

Men's team

Women's singles

Women's doubles

Women's team

Mixed doubles

References 
Medallists from previous Asian Games – Soft tennis

Soft tennis
medalists